Dobročovice is a municipality and village in Prague-East District in the Central Bohemian Region of the Czech Republic. It has about 300 inhabitants.

History
The first written mention of Dobročovice is from 1394.

References

External links

Villages in Prague-East District